Carlile Henry Hayes Macartney (1842–1924) was a British painter and Orientalist, noted for his portraits.

Life and career
Macartney was born on 3 March 1842 to Maxwell Macartney, a doctor, and Maxwell's first wife Emily Eliza Hayes.
He was a student at Clare College, graduating in 1866. As well as a painter  Macartney was an orientalist academic, producing several English versions of oriental text and a barrister at the Inner Temple. Macartney, along with his half brother, Sir Mervyn Macartney, were amongst the founders of the Art Workers' Guild in 1884. Macartney lived at Foxholds House, Thatcham  which was designed by Sir Mervyn Macartney in 1895, and is now home to the regional office of English Nature. He married Louisa Gardiner and their son Carlile Aylmer Macartney was a noted academic specialising in the history and politics of East-Central Europe and in particular the history of Austria and Hungary.

Work
Macartney painted both landscapes and portraits, exhibiting them at Dudley Museum and Art Gallery, the Grosvenor Gallery, the Walker Art Gallery, Manchester City Art Gallery and at the Royal Academy of Art.

Several of his paintings are in the collections of the Tate Gallery, Royal Society of Medicine, British Dental Association Dental Museum and the Government Art Collection.

See also
 List of Orientalist artists
 Orientalism

References

1842 births
1924 deaths
19th-century British painters
20th-century British painters
19th-century British male artists
British male painters
British orientalists
Orientalist painters
Alumni of Clare College, Cambridge
British barristers
Members of the Inner Temple
20th-century British male artists